Qanbar Mahalleh may refer to:
 Qanbar Mahalleh, Astara
 Qanbar Mahalleh, Talesh
 Qanbar Mahalleh, Kargan Rud, Talesh County